The following is a list of the 84 schools who field men's ice hockey teams and the 72 schools who field women's ice hockey teams in NCAA Division III competition.

Men

Notes
 The NCAA began sponsoring Division III hockey as a championship sport in the 1983–84 season.
 SUNY Plattsburgh's 1987 national championship was vacated by the NCAA Committee on Infractions. (No championship was awarded that year.)
 Lebanon Valley previously competed in Division III from 1998–2010. The school dropped varsity hockey in 2010, competing at the ACHA Division I club level until 2016 when it re-elevated its men's team and added women's hockey.
 Westfield State suspended its program from 1989 to 2008.
 In 2020, the 12-team field was selected but the tournament was not played due to the COVID-19 pandemic.

Women

Notes
 The NCAA began sponsoring Division III women's hockey as a championship sport in the 2001–02 season.

See also
List of NCAA Division I ice hockey programs
List of NCAA Division II ice hockey programs
List of NCAA Division III institutions
List of NCAA Division III football programs

External links
USCHO men's team list
USCHO women's team list

Division III
Division III Programs
NCAA Division III ice hockey